Miracle on 34th Street is a 1994 American Christmas fantasy comedy-drama film co-written and co-produced by John Hughes, and directed by Les Mayfield. The film stars Richard Attenborough, Elizabeth Perkins, Dylan McDermott, J.T. Walsh, James Remar, Mara Wilson, and Robert Prosky. It is the first theatrical remake of the original 1947 film. Like the original, this film was released by 20th Century Fox.

The New York City based Macy's department store declined any involvement with this remake, saying “we feel the original stands on its own and could not be improved upon.” The fictitious "Cole's" became its replacement. Gimbels had gone out of business in 1987; hence it was replaced by the fictional "Shopper's Express".

Plot
Cole's Department Store's special events director Dorey Walker fires the Cole's Department Store's Santa Claus Tony Falacchi after he gets drunk before taking part in the Thanksgiving parade. Immediately trying to find a replacement, she spots an elderly man who had been berating the inebriated Santa before the parade. When Dorey begs him to take over, he introduces himself as Kris Kringle. Kris does so well during the parade that he is immediately hired by Cole's, despite his apparent belief that he is the real Santa Claus.

Kris is lauded by the children and parents who come to visit him, and his unusual proclivity to direct shoppers to other stores where toys can be bought more cheaply is turned into a successful marketing campaign for Cole's. The sudden turnaround of Cole's, which had only recently survived a hostile takeover bid by Victor Landberg, enrages executives at rival firm Shopper's Express, who are led by Jim Duff.

Dorey has persuaded her six-year-old daughter, Susan, that Santa Claus does not exist, and is concerned by Kris's influence on her. Dorey's boyfriend, attorney Bryan Bedford, does his best to convince Susan to believe. While being babysat one night by Kris, Susan shares with him her Christmas wish: she would like a dad, a house pictured in the Cole's Christmas catalogue, and a baby brother. Kris asks if she would begin to believe in Santa if she got all those things, and Susan agrees that she would.

Landberg and Duff realize that Kris believes himself to be Santa Claus and leads a plot to destroy his credibility. Duff and his fellow executives pay Falacchi to antagonize Kris in the street and feign an injury when Kris raises his walking stick, leading to Kris's arrest. Bryan provides Kris with legal support and arranges for a court hearing where Kris can make his case. Dorey convinces the chairman of Cole's to show solidarity with Kris, drumming up support from the public. At the court hearing, prosecutor Ed Collins makes the case that Kris is mentally unfit for society, allowing him to state to the court that he is the real Santa Claus.

As Judge Henry Harper is about to make his decision, ruling in favour of the prosecution, Susan approaches the judge with a Christmas card containing a $1 bill. On the back, the words In God We Trust are circled. The judge realizes that if the US Department of Treasury can put its official faith in God on US currency with no required standard of evidence, then the people of New York can place their faith in Santa Claus in the same way. Judge Harper dismisses the case, declaring that Santa is real, existing in the person of Kris Kringle.

Following the court case, Dorey and Bryan are maneuvered by Kris into realizing their true feelings for each other, and are married in a small ceremony after the Christmas Eve Midnight Mass.

On Christmas morning, Susan wakes to the news of the marriage and is elated to find that she has received one part of her Christmas wish. Together, Susan, Dorey, and Bryan drive out to the catalogue house and find that Kris - who has now departed 'overseas' - has arranged for them to purchase it, which they can now afford due to the size of Dorey's Christmas bonus.

With two of Susan's wishes fulfilled, Dorey asks her what the third one was, and she triumphantly announces that it was a baby brother. Dorey and Bryan both look at each other, shocked, before glancing down at Dorey's stomach and sharing a kiss.

Cast
 Richard Attenborough as Kris Kringle, said to be the real Santa Claus. He reluctantly takes on the duty as Cole's Santa Claus after Tony Falacchi is fired.
 Elizabeth Perkins as Dorey Walker, Susan's mother. She works as the director of special events for Cole's, and is Bryan Bedford's girlfriend.
 Dylan McDermott as Bryan Bedford, a lawyer who's Dorey's boyfriend and neighbor.
 J. T. Walsh as Ed Collins, a lawyer who acts as the city prosecutor, as well as an associate of Victor Landberg.
 James Remar as Jack Duff, a high-ranking Shoppers' Express executive in league with Victor Landberg.
 Mara Wilson as Susan Walker, Dorey's 6-year-old daughter.
 Robert Prosky as Judge Henry Harper, the city judge presiding over Kris' case. He has a grandson who is seen thinking Kris is Santa Claus in the first scene of the film.
 Simon Jones as Donald Shellhammer, the general manager of Cole's, known for his departing phrase "Chin-Chin". 
 Jane Leeves as Alberta Leonard, another minion under Landberg.
 William Windom as C.F. Cole, the proprietor of Cole's
 Allison Janney as a brazen woman shopper in Cole's Christmas Shopping Center. 
 Jack McGee as Tony Falacchi, a Cole's employee who was fired from being the store's Santa Claus after being caught intoxicated and becomes involved in Landberg, Leonard, and Duff's plot.
 Mary McCormack as Myrna Foy
 Peter Gerety as a cop
 Jennifer Morrison as Denise
 Horatio Sanz as an orderly
 Ron Beattie as a priest
 Joss Ackland as Victor Landberg (uncredited), the greedy owner of a competing store who is eager to see Cole's go out of business so he can buy out the facility and extend his market.

Various newscasters portrayed by Rosanna Scotto, Joe Moskowitz, Lester Holt, Susie Park, and Janet Kauss

Release
The film had its premiere at Radio City Music Hall on November 15, 1994 with a 30-minute stage show with scenes from The Radio City Christmas Spectacular featuring The Rockettes as well as a performance from Kenny G.

Reception
At the box office, the film opened at #8 with $2,753,208 and eventually finished with $17,320,136 in North America and $46,264,384 worldwide.

On Rotten Tomatoes, the film has a score of  based on reviews from  critics, with an average rating of 6.2/10. TV Guide called the film "curiously depressing", while Desson Howe of The Washington Post said, in contrast to the 1947 version, "[it] will not be found on television (or its computer equivalent) half a century from now." Its supporters included Gene Siskel & Roger Ebert, who gave the film "two thumbs up" on their show. Michael Medved of Sneak Previews said "This is the new holiday classic America has been waiting for."

Audiences polled by CinemaScore gave the film an average grade of "A" on an A+ to F scale.

Soundtrack

Track listing

Tracklisting verified from the album's liner notes.

See also

 Miracle on 34th Street (1947)
 Miracle on 34th Street (1973)
 List of Christmas films
 Santa Claus in film

References

External links

 
 
 
 

1994 films
1994 comedy-drama films
1994 fantasy films
20th Century Fox films
American children's comedy films
American children's fantasy films
American Christmas comedy-drama films
American courtroom films
Remakes of American films
Films scored by Bruce Broughton
American Sign Language films
Children's Christmas films
1990s English-language films
Films directed by Les Mayfield
Films produced by John Hughes (filmmaker)
Films set in department stores
Films set in Manhattan
Films set in New York City
Films shot in Chicago
Films shot in Illinois
Films shot in New York City
Miracle on 34th Street
Santa Claus in film
Films with screenplays by John Hughes (filmmaker)
1990s Christmas comedy-drama films
1990s American films